This is a list of English football transfers for the 2003–04 winter transfer window. Only moves featuring at least one Premier League or First Division club are listed.

The winter transfer window opened on 1 January 2004, although a few transfers took place prior to that date. Players without a club may join one at any time, either during or in between transfer windows. Clubs below Premier League level may also sign players on loan at any time. If need be, clubs may sign a goalkeeper on an emergency loan, if all others are unavailable.

Post-window signings
1 September
Neil Sullivan from Tottenham Hotspur to Chelsea, free
James McFadden from Motherwell to Everton, £1.25m
Nigel Martyn from Leeds United to Everton, Nominal
Kevin Kilbane from Sunderland to Everton, £750,000
Mark Pembridge from Everton to Fulham, £500,000

January transfers
The transfer window re-opened on 1 January 2004 for clubs in the top two divisions. It remained open until 00:00 GMT on 1 September 2004.

1 January 2004
Michael Brown from Sheffield United to Tottenham Hotspur, £100,000
2 January 2004 
Fabien Barthez from Manchester United to Olympique de Marseille, season-long loan
Nikos Dabizas from Newcastle United to Leicester City, free
6 January 2004
Peter Enckelman from Aston Villa to Blackburn Rovers, £150,000
9 January 2004
Eyal Berkovic from Manchester City to Portsmouth, free
12 January 2004
Alan Wright from Middlesbrough to Sheffield United, free
14 January 2004
David James from West Ham United to Manchester City, £2m
17 January 2004
Andy Melville from Fulham to West Ham United, swap deal with Ian Pearce
20 January 2004
Ian Pearce from West Ham United to Fulham, swap deal with Andy Melville
23 January 2004 
Louis Saha from Fulham to Manchester United, £12.82m
21 January 2004 
Moritz Volz from Arsenal to Fulham, Nominal
22 January 2004
Nigel Reo-Coker from Wimbledon to West Ham United, Undisclosed
25 January 2004
Carl Cort from Newcastle United to Wolverhampton Wanderers, £2m
27 January 2004 
José Antonio Reyes from Sevilla to Arsenal, £10.5m
Michael Gray from Sunderland to Blackburn Rovers, free
29 January 2004
Nolberto Solano from Newcastle United to Aston Villa, £1.5m
30 January 2004 
Scott Parker from Charlton Athletic to Chelsea, £10m
Ivica Mornar from RSC Anderlecht to Portsmouth, Undisclosed
Ricardinho from Sao Pãulo to Middlesbrough, Free
2 February 2004
Jerome Thomas from Arsenal to Charlton Athletic, £100,000
Martin Taylor from Blackburn Rovers to Birmingham City, £1.25m
Jon Stead from Huddersfield Town to Blackburn Rovers, £1.25m
Jermain Defoe from West Ham United to Tottenham Hotspur, £7m
Bobby Zamora from Tottenham Hotspur to West Ham United, Swap for Defoe

References

Trans
Football transfers winter 2003–04
Winter 2003-04